Universal Music Group owns, or has a joint share in, many of the record labels listed here.
According to UMG official site, the main labels are Abbey Road Studios, Bravado, Capitol Music Group, Decca Records, Def Jam Recordings, Deutsche Grammophon, EMI, Interscope Geffen A&M, Island Records, Motown Records, Polydor, Republic Records, Verve Label Group, and Virgin Music, as well as other UMG divisions (Universal Music Enterprises, Universal Music Nashville, Universal Music Latin Entertainment, and Universal Music Publishing Group).

Interscope & Geffen Records

Interscope Records

Aftermath Entertainment
AWGE
Billion Dollar Baby Entertainment
Shady Records
F2 Records
Maloof Musi
Top Dawg Entertainment (Jay Rock & Schoolboy Q releases only)
Downtown Records
Dreamville Records
Streamline Records
Suretone Records
Weapons of Mass Entertainment
Zone 4
KonLive Distribution
Tropical Records
KIDinaKORNER
222 Records
EarsDrummers Entertainment
N.E.E.T. Recordings
Konichiwa Records
Hits Since '87
HighUp Entertainment (Korean releases only)
Mad Love Records
Friends Keep Secrets
Division1
Creative Arts Recordings
Play the Beat Entertainment
YG Entertainment (Blackpink's Korean releases only)
 The Black Label (Jeon Somi's Korean releases only)
SMG Music

Geffen Records

Hybe (Korean releases only)
Belift Lab (joint venture with CJ ENM)
Big Hit Music (excluding Tomorrow X Together)
 KOZ Entertainment
Pledis Entertainment
 Source Music
 ADOR

Capitol Music Group

Astralwerks
Blue Note Records
Block Entertainment
Capitol Records
Deep Well Records
Deep Well Music Publishing
Get Money Gang Entertainment
G-Unit Records
G-Note Records
G-Unit Film & Television
Harvest Records 
Hi or Hey Records 
Manhattan Records
Matriarch Records
mau5trap
Metamorphosis Music
Motown Records
Priority Records
Quality Control Music
RedOne Records
Siren Records
10 Records
Circa Records 
Mi5 Recordings
RMG Music Group
Str8 Wired Entertainment
Konspiracy Theory Music
Pinegrove Records
The Trak Kartel Records
Tracklist

Republic Records

American Recordings
Aware Records
Big Hit Music (Tomorrow X Together's Korean releases only)
BME Recordings
Brushfire Records
Casablanca Records
Cash Money Content (joint venture with Atria Publishing Group)
Cash Money Records
Galactic Records
Indie Pop Music
John Varvatos Records (joint venture with John Varvatos)
JYP Entertainment (Korean releases only)
Lava Records
Mercury Records (since 2022)
Next Plateau Entertainment
Photo Finish Records
Posty Co. 
Republic Records: Kids & Family
Nickelodeon Republic Records: Kids & Family Announces Worldwide Music Deal With Nickelodeon
Rich Gang
Schoolboy Records
Serjical Strike Records
So What the Fuss Records
Trukfit
Universal Arabic Music
Uptown Records
XO Records 
YMCMB Apparel
Young Money Entertainment

Island Records

4th & B'way Records
Mercury Records 
Safehouse Records
Super Records
Teen Island
Tuff Gong
 Espoir records

Def Jam Recordings

ARTium Recordings
Def Jam South
Desert Storm Records
Disturbing tha Peace
Radio Killa Records
Black Star Records
Circa 13 Music
Darksyde Productions Inc Records
We The Best

Capitol Christian Music Group

 Credential Recordings
 ForeFront Records
 Motown Gospel
 Sparrow Records

Universal Music Group Nashville
MCA Nashville Records
Mercury Nashville Records
Capitol Records Nashville
EMI Records Nashville

Universal Music Latin Entertainment
Universal Music Latino
Fonovisa Records
Interscope Miami
Disa Records
Capitol Latin
Machete Music
Ivy Queen Musa Sound Corporation
All Star Records
Flow Music
Illegal Life Records
Mas Flow Inc.
Sangre Nueva Music
VI Music

The Verve Label Group
Decca Records
Brunswick Records
Decca Classics
Decca Vision
Deutsche Grammophon
Philips Records
Verve Records
GRP Records
Impulse! Records
Verve Forecast Records

Virgin Music Group
Virgin Music Label & Artist Services
Ingrooves
mtheory Artist Partnerships
PIAS Group (49%)

Universal Music Publishing Group

Criterion Music Corporation
Universal Production Music

Universal Music Enterprises

Hip-O Records
Universal Chronicles
UM3
T-Boy Records 
Urban Legends
Thump Records

Mercury Studios

Eagle Rock Entertainment
Eagle Records
Armoury Records
Eagle Rock Productions
Eagle-i Music

Universal Music UK
Polydor Records
Fascination Records
A&M Records UK
Rolling Stones Records
EMI Records
EMI North
0207 Def Jam
Vertigo Records
Virgin Records
Blackened Recordings
Mercury Records
Ensign Records (pre-1984 catalogue)
Motown UK
PMR Records
Positiva Records
Fiction Records
Universal Music TV
The Universal Music Record Label
Decca Records
Argo Records (UK)
Decca Vision
EmArcy Records
Island Records
Capitol Records UK
All Around the World Productions
Clubland TV
Now 70s
Now 80s
Now 90s
Abbey Road Studios
Globe: Soundtrack and Score
UMC (Universal Music Catalogue)
Calderstone Productions Limited
Charisma Records
Purple Records
ZTT Records

Universal Music France
AZ Records
Barclay Records
Decca Records
Deutsche Grammophon
ECM New Series
MCA Records France
Casablanca Records France
PM:AM Recordings France
Island Def Jam (previously known as Island France, Def Jam France, Mercury Records France and Motown Records France)
Virgin Records France (previously known as Caroline France)
Capitol Label Services
Universal Licensing Music
Polydor Records France
Mosaert
Universal Music Jazz France

Universal Music Japan

Universal J
Perfume Records
Johnnys' Universe 
ASSE!! Records
RX-RECORDS 
Diva Records
Far Eastern Tribe Records
Universal Sigma
A&M Records 
Double Joy International 
DCT Records 
Augusta Records
U-Cube 
Virgin Music (formed by integrating Virgin Records [formerly EMI R] and Delicious Deli Records)
Def Jam Recordings 
Kinashi Records
Republic Records 
EMI Records (formed by integrating EMI Records Japan and Nayutawave Records)
Eastworld 
Go Good Records
Mercury Records Tokyo (UM & Brands)
Third Party Distribution Deal
E-Sum Records
Tunes Tracks 
Universal Classics and Jazz
Universal D
Universal International
Thunderball 667
Pachinko Records
Universal Strategic Marketing Japan
Zero-A 
Top J Records

Universal Music Sweden
Capitol Music Group Sweden 
Capitol Records Sweden
Kavalkad
Lionheart Music
SoFo Records
Virgin Records Sweden
Polar Music
Pope Records
Sonet Records
Stockholm Records

Other Universal Music Group national companies

Under the Universal Music branding

No Emotion
Universal Music Africa 
Universal Music Cameroon
Universal Music Côte d'Ivoire
Motown Gospel Africa (Ivory Coast)
Universal Music Nigeria
Universal Music Senegal
Universal Music South Africa
Def Jam Africa
Universal Music Andina
Universal Music Argentina
Universal Music Austria
Universal Music Australia
Casablanca Records Australia
Dew Process
Golden Era Records
Island Records Australia
Lost Highway Records Australia
Neon Records
Of Leisure
Universal Music Baltics
Universal Music Belgium
ARS Entertainment
Universal Music Brazil
Arsenal Music
Phonomotor Records
Universal Music Bulgaria
Universal Music Canada (Umusic)
Maison Barclay Canada (Quebec)
Universal Music Chile
Universal Music Greater China
Capitol Records China
PolyGram China
Republic Records China
EMI China
Universal Music China
Universal Music Hong Kong
Cinepoly Records
Go East Entertainment
What's Music
EMI Music Hong Kong
Brave Music
Universal Music Taiwan
What's Music
EMI Taiwan
Universal Music Czech Republic
Universal Music Denmark
MBO Group
Copenhagen Records
Universal Music Finland
Spinefarm Records
Johanna Kustannus
Inka Entertainment
Universal Music Germany
Universal Music Domestic Division
Urban Records
Universal Music International Division
Universal Music Classics and Jazz
Koch Universal Music
Universal Music Strategic Marketing
Universal Music Family Entertainment
Polydor/Island
Vertigo/Capitol
Electrola
Odeon Records
Universal Music Hungary
Universal Music India
EMI Records India
VYRL Originals 
Mass Appeal India
Desi Melodies
Universal Music Indonesia
Solid Records
GP Records
Massive Music Entertainment
Wonderland Records
Dominion Records
RFAS Music
Def Jam Indonesia
PreachJa Records
Universal Music Ireland
Universal Music Israel
Universal Music Italy
Island Records Italy
Capitol Records Italy (formerly Polydor Italy)
Virgin Records Italy
Universal Music Korea
Cube Entertainment 
Universal Music Malaysia
Rumpun Records
Universal Music MENA
Universal Music Mexico
EMI Mexico
Universal Music Morocco
Universal Music Netherlands
PM:AM Recordings
Universal Music New Zealand
Universal Music Norway
Jazzland Recordings
UMG Philippines
Island Records Philippines
Def Jam Philippines
Republic Records Philippines
Universal Music Polska
Magic Records
Universal Music Portugal
Universal Music Romania
MediaPro Music
Def Jam Recordings Romania
Universal Music Russia
Universal Music Serbia
Universal Music Singapore
Def Jam Asia
Astralwerks Asia
Universal Music Spain
Vale Music
Universal Music Switzerland
Universal Music Thailand
Universal Music Turkey
Universal Music Vietnam
Universal Production Music
Associated Production Music (joint-venture with Sony Music Publishing)
Sonoton
Bruton Music
Cezame Music
Hard and Kosinus
Deutsche Grammophon Production Music
Flexitracks
KTV
Nuvotone
Sonic Beat Records
Volta Music

Note: Universal Music Group companies around the world are generally licensed to use most of Universal Music Group's legacy labels, such as Polydor, Mercury, etc., as imprints for their local artist repertoire.

Under the EMI branding

EMI Arabia
Soutelphan
Alam El Phan
Relax-in International
Farasan
Rotana Records
EMI Music Argentina
EMI Recorded Music Australia (domestic imprint of Universal Music Australia)
EMI Music Brazil
Discos Copacabana
EMI-Jangada
EMI Music Chile
EMIDISC
EMI Europe Generic
EMI Gold
EMI Music Ireland
EMI Music Hungary 
EMI Music Finland
EMI Music Germany (formerly EMI Electrola)
Electrola
EMI Music Mexico 
Awake Sounds
Capitol Records
Capitol Music Japan
Capitol Latin
Virgin Records
Virgin Music Japan 
Eastworld
Express
Foozay Music
i-Dance
Reservotion Records
SakuraStar Records
SoundTown (EMI Strategic Marketing)
Suite Supuesto!
TM Factory 
Unlimited Records
EMI Music Pakistan
EMI Music South Africa
GramCo 
Minos EMI 
Q-Productions
Reliquias

Other labels
Motown Records
Bravado
Polygram Entertainment
Awesomeness Music
10:22PM
Victor Victor Worldwide
Field Trip Recordings

Third-party major labels distributed by Universal Music Group
ABKCO Records
Cameo-Parkway Records
Because Music
Ed Banger Records
Phantasy
London Recordings 
Factory Records (select catalogues)
Blackened Recordings (excluding North America)
Big Machine Label Group
Big Machine Records
Valory Music
BMLG Records
Nash Icon Music
Disney Music Group 
Walt Disney Records 
Hollywood Records
Hollywood BASIC
Fox Music
DMG Nashville
Walt Disney South
Concord
Razor & Tie
Varèse Sarabande
Varèse Vintage
DIVA Records (owner: Iva Davies; Australia)
Earth Hertz Records
EDGEOUT Records
EP Entertainment
Famous Records
Hater Gang Records
MDM Recordings
Ministry of Sound Australia
Polyversal 
Roc Nation
StarRoc
Takeover Roc Nation
Round Hill Music
Sonorous Entertainment
Warrior Records
Bad Boy Records
GeekGod Media
Rockalur Entertainment (Not Rockalur Ent)
Paramount
Comedy Central Records 
VP Records

Third-party national licensees
Actually Music 
Dreamus 
Mirage Records 
Sena 
Helicon Records 
Prime Music 
Ukrainian Records 
Tuff Gong 
YG Plus 
Musica Studio's 
Off the Record

Defunct/hibernated labels
20th Century Fox Records
 89 Arrogance Recordings
ABC Records
Aladdin Records
A&M Octone Records
A&M Records
Angel Records
Argo Records
Atlanta Artists
Axis Records 
Back Beat Records
Biv 10 Records
Blue Thumb Records
Cadet Records
Caroline Distribution
Chess Records
Cherrytree Records
Chrysalis Records 
Columbia Graphophone Company 
Coral Records
Cypress Records
De-Lite Records
Decca Broadway
DGC Records
 Diamond Star Entertainment
Dolton Records
Dot Records
DreamWorks Records
Duke Records
Dunhill Records
E.G. Records
EMI America Records
EMI Music Japan
EMI Records Japan
EMI USA 
Enigma Records
Fantasy Records
Freedom
Gasoline Alley Records
Hut Records
Impact Records
Imperial Records 
Infinity Records
Intercord Tonträger 
I.R.S. Records
The Island Def Jam Music Group
Kapp Records
Laurie Records
Liberty Records 
Loud Records
MCA Records
Mediarts Records
MGM Records
Minit Records
Nocturne Records
Octone Records
Odeon Records 
Pacific Jazz Records
Paramount Records
Parrot Records
Peacock Records
Perspective Records
Pina Records
Radioactive Records
Regal Zonophone Records 
Revue Records
RMM Records & Video
Roc-A-Fella Records
SBK Records
Shelter Records
Smash Records
Spinnup
SRC Records
Star Trak Entertainment
Silas Records
Tennman Records
Uni Records
United Artists Records 
Universal Records
Universal Republic Records
Universal Motown Republic Group
Universal Motown Records
Uptown Records
UZI Suicide
Vendetta Records
Virgin EMI Records
Vocalion Records
Wing Records
WY Records

See also

References 

Universal Music Group
UMG
Universal Music Group